Nels Nelson may refer to:

 Nels C. Nelson (1875–1964), Danish-American archaeologist
 Nels Nelson (politician) (1917–1992), Canadian Member of Parliament
 Nels Nelsen (1894–1943), Norwegian–Canadian ski jumper
 Nels David Nelson (1918–2003), American mathematician and logician
 Nels H. Nelson (1903–1973), United States Marine Corps general